Swisher Creek is a stream in the U.S. state of Iowa.

Swisher Creek was named after Benjamin Swisher, a pioneer settler.

References

Rivers of Johnson County, Iowa
Rivers of Iowa